The 1993 Masters (officially the 1993 Benson & Hedges Masters) was a professional non-ranking snooker tournament that took place between 7 and 14 February 1993 at the Wembley Conference Centre in London, England.

Stephen Hendry retained the title by beating James Wattana 9–5 in the final. After the final the Benson & Hedges Masters trophy was given to Hendry to keep for winning the event five times in a row.

Field
Stephen Hendry, defending champion and World Champion was the number 1 seed. Places were allocated to the top 16 players in the world rankings. Players seeded 15 and 16 played in the wild-card round against the winner of the qualifying event, Chris Small (ranked 75), and Ken Doherty (ranked 21), who was the wild-card selection. Nigel Bond, Darren Morgan and Chris Small were making their debuts in the Masters.

Wild-card round
In the preliminary round, the wild-card players plays the 15th and 16th seeds:

Main draw

Final

Qualifying
Chris Small won the qualifying tournament, known as the 1992 Benson & Hedges Championship at the time. The event carried ranking points, but only ten percent of the usual tariff.

Century breaks
Total: 11
 134  Jimmy White
 131, 129, 105, 105, 101  Stephen Hendry
 131  John Parrott
 107  James Wattana
 106  Steve Davis
 101  Darren Morgan
 100  Gary Wilkinson

Darren Morgan's century was scored in the wild-card round.

References 

Masters (snooker)
Masters
Masters (snooker)
Masters (snooker)
February 1993 sports events in the United Kingdom